The 1912–13 NHA season was the fourth season of the National Hockey Association (NHA). Six teams played 20 games each. The Quebec Bulldogs won the league championship to retain the Stanley Cup. They played and defeated the Sydney Millionaires in a challenge after the regular season.

League business
The Arena Gardens was completed in Toronto and the two dormant NHA franchises started play as the Toronto Hockey Club ('Torontos' or 'Blue Shirts') and the Toronto Tecumsehs ('Indians'). The Arena Gardens hosted a pre-season exhibition match between the Montreal Canadiens and Montreal Wanderers, at which a brawl broke out and Sprague Cleghorn would be charged with assault.

For this season the NHA teams played again with six skaters, abandoning the position of rover. It was agreed that from February onwards, the teams would play with seven. However, after several games at the start of February played with the rover, the decision was made to abandon the rover position permanently.

The Stanley Cup trustees decided prior to this season that all future Stanley Cup challenges would take place after the end of the regular season.

The Montreal Canadiens adopted a 'barber pole' style of jersey similar to the Ottawas with a CAC logo, prompting complaints from the Ottawas. The Ottawas' complaints were resolved with the Canadiens introducing a second jersey of solid red, with a wide blue stripe around the chest and the letter 'C' as a logo, used only when playing Ottawa. The solid red jersey with a wide blue stripe would be adopted full-time the following season and is the basis for the Canadiens jersey design to this day.

Regular season

Final standings

Stanley Cup challenges

Sydney vs. Quebec

Joe Malone scored 9 goals in the first game. He was not in the lineup for the second game.

Quebec wins series 20–5

Post-season exhibition series
After the season a series was arranged between Ottawa and Montreal Wanderers and Quebec to play in New York. Ottawa and Montreal played first, with the winner to play-off against Quebec. After the Wanderers defeated Ottawa 10–8 (3–2, 7–6), the Wanderers won the two-game series against Quebec 12–10 (9–5, 3–5).

 Sources

Quebec series in Victoria, B.C.

Quebec travelled to Victoria, British Columbia to play an exhibition series with the Victoria Senators. The Senators had requested a challenge series with Quebec, but would not travel to Quebec City, but would play a series in Toronto. Bulldogs would not agree to defend the Cup on any other ice than their home rink. The Senators would win the best-of-three series.
 March 24, 7-5 for Victoria; March 27, 6-3 for Quebec; March 29, for 6-1 Victoria to win exhibition Series 2-1

Game one was played with 7 players on a side including the Rover position and PCHL rules.

Game two was played with 6 players on a side without a Rover position under NHA rules.

Game three was played with seven players on a side including the Rover position and PCHL rules. Victoria won the series two games to one.

Tecumsehs in Boston
The Tecumsehs travelled to Boston to play an exhibition series against New Glasgow of Nova Scotia.

Schedule and results

‡ Played with rover (7 man hockey)

Player statistics

Goaltending averages

 A – Moran's record includes 4 minutes of overtime.
 B – Vezina's record includes 17 minutes of overtime.
 C – Nicholson's record includes 28 minutes of overtime.
 D – Benedict and LeSueur shared duties in eight games.
 E – Holmes and Marchand shared duties in three games.

Scoring leaders

Stanley Cup engraving
The 1913 Stanley Cup was presented by the trophy's trustee William Foran.

The following Bulldogs players and staff were members of the Stanley Cup winning team.

1912–13 Quebec Bulldogs

See also
National Hockey Association
List of pre-NHL seasons
List of Stanley Cup champions
1912 in sports
1913 in sports

References

Bibliography

Notes

1912–13 in Canadian ice hockey by league
National Hockey Association seasons